Irdex is a genus of earwigs belonging to the family Spongiphoridae.

The species of this genus are found in Australia.

Species

Species:

Irdex bicuneatus 
Irdex brevis 
Irdex burri

References

Forficulina